Jonathan Robert Lester (born 8 December 1989, Palmerston North) is a racing driver from New Zealand, competing in various GT3 and touring car championships throughout the Asia-Pacific region.

Career

Family Heritage
Jono is a third generation driver, with grandfather Rob, father Richard and Aunt Debbie all winning National titles.

Grandparents Rob and Wendy originally set up the Manfeild circuit in Feilding, running events and operations for over thirty years until retirement in 2003.

Rob was awarded the prestigious Jim Clark Trophy in 1979. Richard and Debbie were respective Steel Trophy recipients in 1983 and 1986, representing New Zealand's top driver under 21 years of age.

Richard founded the Shell Formula Ford Scholarship in the early 1990s, which launched the career of many drivers including Bathurst winner Greg Murphy.

Early Years
Jono Lester didn't take the conventional junior pathway of karting, beginning his driving career in Formula Vee at age 13.

He dovetailed his two seasons in Formula Vee with Formula Challenge, and occasional races in HQ Holdens and the North Island Endurance Series.

He won the 2014 Formula Challenge Summer Series.

Porsche Carrera Cups
Lester's career took another unconventional turn when he graduated to the Porsche GT3 Cup in 2006.

In doing so he became the world's youngest competitor in a Porsche one-make Cup, aged 16 years and 10 months.

Four months later, in March 2007, he took his maiden victory at Timaru International Motor Raceway to become the World's Youngest Porsche Cups race winner.

Lester finished fourth overall in his debut season, trailing Craig Baird, Fabian Coulthard and Matt Halliday.

In 2009, he won both the Hamilton 400 and Taupo A1GP Trophy events, however a brief foray in the 2008 Porsche Carrera Cup Australia Championship was curtailed due to a lack of budget.

Lester won a Porsche Motorsport Talent Factory Scholarship in 2010, after a global shootout of 12 drivers at ACI Vallelunga Circuit, Italy. His prize was a start in the Porsche Supercup at the Monza Grand Prix, where he finished 13th in a field of 32.

GT Racing

2012
Lester was signed by the PETRONAS Syntium Team in 2012 for Japan's Super Taikyu Series. He finished second overall in the Championship, driving a Mercedes-Benz SLS AMG GT3.

2013
Lester returned to Japan with the PETRONAS team in 2013. He again finished second overall in the Super Taikyu Series.

He also joined Bernd Schneider for the 12 Hour Merdeka Millennium Endurance (MME) race at Sepang, but retired while leading in the early stages with an engine failure.

2015
Lester joined New Zealand's Trass Family Motorsport for 2015, driving a Ferrari 458 in both the Bathurst 12 Hour and the Australian GT Championship.

He scored five of seven pole positions in the Australian GT Championship, including three in a row to set two all-time category records.

Lester's final race with the team ended in controversy, when the TFM Ferrari was disqualified while leading the season-ending Highlands 101 in New Zealand, after pitting outside the compulsory time window.

2016
Lester returned to Asia in 2016, competing in Lamborghini Super Trofeo Asia, GT Asia, China GT and the Asian Le Mans Series.

In Lamborghini Super Trofeo Asia, he finished second overall with three pole positions, one win and nine podiums, driving with Japanese Yudai Uchida.

In the GT Asia Series, he scored GruppeM Racing's first and only podium finish on debut with the team at the Okayama International Circuit, driving a Porsche GT3-R with Englishman Tim Sugden.

In China GT, he was a winner in GTC at Chengdu driving a Porsche 911 GT3 Cup with Chinese driver Pan Chao with the local JRM Team.

In the Asian Le Mans Series, he paired with former F1 test driver Fairuz Fauzy of Malaysia, and Australian Liam Talbot in OD Racing's McLaren 650S GT3.

Lester also made his Japanese Super GT debut in 2016, with a one-off drive at the Suzuka 1000 km in a Lamborghini Huracan GT3 with the Direction Racing team. The car finished many laps down in 19th after multiple tyre failures during the race.

2017
In 2017, Lester made his full-time Japanese Super GT debut. See the section below for details.

2018
In 2018, Lester is racing in the Thailand Super Series, Blancpain GT Series Asia and the Intercontinental GT Challenge.

In the Thailand Super Series, he was a sole entrant at the opening round of the Championship in a Lamborghini Huracan Super Trofeo, but was uncompetitive.

He changed vehicles for round two onwards, pairing with Japanese Akihiro Asai in a Vattana Motorsport Lamborghini Gallardo FL2. The pair won three of six races together, with Lester finishing third in the Championship and helping Vattana Motorsport to the Team's Title.

In Blancpain GT Series Asia, Lester was bought in mid-season to partner Australian Nick Foster at HubAuto Corsa, driving a Ferrari 488.

The pair finished second in their first race together at Fuji Speedway, and took HubAuto's first win at the following round in Shanghai. At the conclusion of the 2018 season, Lester and Foster netted two wins and four podiums from six races.

In the Intercontinental GT Challenge, Lester joined Japanese team D’station Racing for the Suzuka 10 Hours in a Porsche 991 GT3-R. Driving with Tsubasa Kondo and Satoshi Hoshino, they finished many laps down in 28th with multiple unscheduled pit stops to rectify electrical and cooling issues.

SUPER GT
Lester joined Gulf Racing in the GT300 class of Japanese Super GT  for 2017, driving a Porsche 991 GT3-R.

Paired with Japanese Kyosuke Mineo, they scored a podium on debut at Okayama, finished third after starting 15th on the grid.

Three more top five finishes throughout the season netted Gulf Racing 8th overall in the GT300 standings.

Lester was set to return with the team for 2018, but a budget cut forced an eleventh hour exit. Mineo also left the team.

New Zealand

2012
At the start of 2012, Lester made the step into open-wheel racing joining the Toyota Racing Series with ETEC Motorsport. He scored a podium in the opening race of the season and finished sixth in the New Zealand Grand Prix.

In another deviation from GT racing, he joined John McIntyre Racing for the V8 SuperTourers Endurance Championship Endurance Series in a Ford Falcon FG. Lester and McIntyre scored two podium finishes at the opening round, the Taupo 400.

He also joined Simon Ellingham at Fastway Racing, finishing third overall in the South Island Endurance Series driving a Porsche 997 GT3 Cup.

2013
Lester returned with both John McIntyre Racing and Fastway Racing for 2013.

An uncompetitive run in the V8 SuperTourers saw Lester leave the team after two rounds of the Endurance Series, while at Fastway Racing Lester and Ellingham clean-swept the New Zealand Endurance Championship with two poles and two victories in their Porsche 997.

2014
Lester raced in both the North and South Island Endurance Series’ in 2014 with Trass Family Motorsport, driving a Ferrari F430 Challenge.

He won the Hampton Downs 3 Hour race, driving with Robin Gray.

2015
Lester returned to the local Endurance Series’ in 2015 with Trass Family Motorsport, this time driving a GT3-spec Ferrari F430 with Graeme Smyth. The car was fast but unreliable, and failed to finish a race.

2020
Lester spent 2020 competed in New Zealand due to COVID-19 travel restrictions, driving for the CRE Corliss Race Engineering team in their Ford Performance Mustang, as well as DFM Racing in a unique Audi-bodied V8 Supercar. Lester and Matt Dovey drove the Audi to second in the NIERDC 3 Hour Series (Class 1) with two poles, one victory and two fastest laps.

Awards
Lester was a recipient of the Steel Trophy in 2007, representing New Zealand's top driver under 21 years of age.

In 2008, Lester was awarded The President's Scholarship, a MotorSport New Zealand award in conjunction with world-renowned sports neuroscientist Dr. Kerry Spackman.

Racing record

Career summary

References

External links
 
 
 

1989 births
Living people
Sportspeople from Palmerston North
New Zealand racing drivers
Toyota Racing Series drivers